Don Leopardo is the third album by the Argentine Rock band Bersuit Vergarabat, released in 1996. Recorded in the Pichón Mobile Studio

Track listing
 "Espíritu De Esta Selva" [Jungle Spirit] (Cordera, Subirá, Céspedes, Martín, Righi, Verenzuela) – 3:56
 "Bolivian Surf" – 2:59
 "Bolero Militar" [Military Ballad]– 3:28
 "Yo No Fui" [It Wasn't Me] – 5:01
 "Cajón 5 estrellas" [5-Star Coffin] – 3:06
 "Cielo Trucho" [False Sky] – 3:09
 "Abundancia" [Abundance] – 1:07
 "Ojo Por Ójojo ôô" [Eye for an Oh-Ho-Ho] – 2:56
 "La Mujer Perfecta" [The Perfect Woman] – 11:57
 "Madrugón" [Early Bird] – 4:06
 "Ruego" [I Request] – 4:08
 "Querubin" [Cherub] – 4:04
 "Encapuchados" [Hooded] – 4:22
 "En Trance" [In Trance] – 3:33
 "Requiem" – 1:15
 "Al Fondo De La Red" [At the Bottom of the Net] – 4:49
 "Piel De Gallina" [Goosebump] – 3:36
 "Mi Caramelo" (Cordera) [My Candy] – 3:20

Personnel
Eduardo Avena – percussion, chorus
Pepe Céspedes – guitar, bass, chorus
Carlos Martin – percussion, programming, drums
Oscar Righi – guitar, programming, pre-Production, chorus
Mauricio Ubal – arranger, producer

1996 albums
Bersuit Vergarabat albums